The Relentless Moon is a science fiction novel by American writer Mary Robinette Kowal.  The book was published by Tor Books on July 24, 2020.  It is the 3rd book in the Lady Astronaut series.

Reception
The Relentless Moon was nominated for the 2021 Hugo Award for Best Novel.

Publishers Weekly stated that this book "...is hard science fiction at its most emotional, intimate, and insightful," also noting that "Kowal effortlessly blends espionage, spacefaring adventure, and social fiction, paying particular attention to the details of life as a female astronaut in the 1960s."

References

External links
"The Relentless Moon" on Kowal's website

2020 American novels
Tor Books books
American science fiction novels